Rusk County is a county located in Texas. As of the 2020 census, its population was 52,214. Its county seat is Henderson. The county is named for Thomas Jefferson Rusk, a secretary of war of the Republic of Texas.

Rusk County is part of the Longview, TX Metropolitan Statistical Area as well as the Longview–Marshall, TX Combined Statistical Area.

History
Prior to Texas annexation in 1845, the land while from time to time occupied by Caddoan peoples, was generally unpopulated until 1819 when Cherokee Indians, led by The Bowl settled in what is now Rusk County. The Treaty of Bowles Village on February 23, 1836, between the Republic of Texas and the Cherokee and twelve affiliated tribes, gave parts of western Rusk County along with parts of today's Gregg and Van Zandt counties, in addition to the whole areas of Cherokee and Smith counties to the tribes. They remained on these lands until the Cherokee War in the summer of 1839. Thus the Cherokee were driven out of Rusk County only to return in 1844 and 1845 with the purchase of 10,000 acres of land by Benjamin Franklin Thompson a white man married to a Cherokee. This established the Mount Tabor Indian Community, some six miles south of present-day Kilgore that later spread to incorporate areas near Troup, Arp and Overton, Texas. Originally organized as a part of Nacogdoches County, Rusk was established as its own county by the Congress of the Republic of Texas on January 16, 1843. By 1850, it was the second-most populous county in Texas of the 78 counties that had been organized at that time, according to the 1850 census. Rusk County's population was 8,148 then; it was surpassed only by Harrison County with 11,822 people.

With the discovery of oil in Joinerville in October 1930, an oil boom began that caused county population to nearly double during the next decade, and caused dramatic changes in the county towns. Rusk is one of the five counties that are part of the East Texas Oil Field, whose production has been a major part of the economy since that time. 

Rusk County was one of 25 entirely dry counties in Texas until January 2012. The city of Henderson at that time opted to allow selling and serving beer and wine.

America's worst school disaster happened in Rusk County in 1937, when nearly 300 people, most of them children, were killed in a natural gas explosion at the London Independent School District (which has since consolidated into West Rusk County Consolidated Independent School District).

Geography

Major highways
  U.S. Highway 79
  U.S. Highway 84
  U.S. Highway 259
  State Highway 42
  State Highway 43
  State Highway 64
  State Highway 135
  State Highway 149
  State Highway 315
  State Highway 322
  State Highway 323
  U.S. Highway 59
   Interstate 69 is currently under construction and will follow the current route of U.S. 59 in most places.

Adjacent counties
 Smith County (northwest)
 Gregg County (north)
 Harrison County (northeast)
 Panola County (east)
 Shelby County (southeast)
 Nacogdoches County (south)
 Cherokee County (southwest)

Communities

Cities

 Easton (mostly in Gregg County)
 Henderson (county seat)
 Kilgore (mostly in Gregg County)
 Mount Enterprise
 New London
 Overton (partly in Smith County)
 Reklaw (partly in Cherokee County)
 Tatum (partly in Panola County)

Census-designated place
 Lake Cherokee (partly in Gregg County)

Unincorporated communities

 Anadarko
 Brachfield
 Bryce
 Caledonia
 Chalk Hill
 Chapman
 Church Hill
 Concord
 Dirgin
 Glenfawn
 Good Springs
 Joinerville
 Laird Hill
 Laneville
 Leverett's Chapel
 Minden
 Monroe
 New Salem
 Oak Hill
 Pine Hill
 Pitner Junction
 Price
 Selman City
 Stewart
 Turnertown

Ghost towns

 Craig
 Cross Roads
 Harmony Hill
 Lawsonville
 London
 Oak Flats
 Pirtle
 Pleasant Grove
 Pone
 Sexton City

Demographics

Note: the US Census treats Hispanic/Latino as an ethnic category. This table excludes Latinos from the racial categories and assigns them to a separate category. Hispanics/Latinos can be of any race.

According to the 2000 census, 47,372 people, 17,364 households, and 12,727 families resided in the county. The population density was 51 people per square mile (20/km2).  The  19,867 housing units averaged 22 per square mile (8/km2).  The racial makeup of the county was 74.89% White, 19.21% Black or African American, 0.35% Native American, 0.24% Asian, 0.01% Pacific Islander, 4.22% from other races, and 1.09% from two or more races.  About 8.44% of the population was Hispanic or Latino of any race. In 2020, its population was 52,214.

Of the 17,364 households, 32.50% had children under the age of 18 living with them, 58.20% were married couples living together, 11.20% had a female householder with no husband present, and 26.70% were not families. About 24.20% of all households was made up of individuals, and 12.90% had someone living alone who was 65 years of age or older.  The average household size was 2.57 and the average family size was 3.05.

In the county, the population was distributed as 24.90% under the age of 18, 8.30% from 18 to 24, 27.80% from 25 to 44, 23.30% from 45 to 64, and 15.60% who were 65 years of age or older.  The median age was 38 years. For every 100 females, there were 104.00 males.  For every 100 females age 18 and over, there were 103.10 males.

The median income for a household in the county was $32,898, and for a family was $39,185. Males had a median income of $30,956 versus $19,749 for females. The per capita income for the county was $16,674.  About 10.90% of families and 14.60% of the population were below the poverty line, including 20.80% of those under age 18 and 13.00% of those age 65 or over.

Rusk County is home to three privately run facilities for state prisoners:  the East Texas Multi-Use Facility for treatment of state inmates, privately operated by the Management and Training Corporation; the Bradshaw State Jail, also private, placed in idle status as of August 2020 because of declining populations; and the Billy Moore Correctional Center, also privately run by MTC.

Education
The following school districts serve Rusk County:

Rusk County's first officially authorized school was the Rusk County Academy.

Politics
Rusk County is represented by Bryan Hughes, a Republican from Mineola, Texas, in the Texas State Senator for Senate District 1, which includes Rusk County. Travis Clardy, a Republican from Nacogdoches, is the Texas State Representative for House District 11, which includes Rusk County. Trent Ashby, a Republican from Lufkin who was born in Rusk County in 1972, represents District 57, which includes Angelina and several other mostly rural East Texas counties.

See also

 National Register of Historic Places listings in Rusk County, Texas
 Recorded Texas Historic Landmarks in Rusk County
 Mount Tabor Indian Community

References

External links

 Rusk County government's website
 Historic materials about Rusk County, hosted by the Portal to Texas History
 
 Rusk County Sheriff's Office
 Rusk County Airport
 Mount Tabor Indian Community tribal government website

 
1843 establishments in the Republic of Texas
Populated places established in 1843
Longview metropolitan area, Texas